David S. Salomon, Ph.D. (born 1947) is a cancer research scientist and co-discoverer of the Cripto-1 gene. His areas of research include stem cells, cell signaling, breast cancer, mammary gland development, small molecule inhibitors, and embryonic development.

Life
Salomon was born in 1947 in Tarrytown, New York. He graduated from Hackley School in Tarrytown, Clark University in Worcester, Massachusetts, and obtained his Ph.D. from State University of New York at Albany. He was a postdoctoral fellow at the Roche Institute of Molecular Biology in Nutley, New Jersey, and spent six years as a staff fellow in the Laboratory of Developmental Biology in the National Institute of Dental Research.

By 1999, he was head of the Tumor Growth Factor Section of the Center for Cancer Research at the National Cancer Institute.  Currently, Scientist Emeritus at the Tumor Growth Factor Section, he has been studying the interaction of growth factors and oncogenes in the etiology of breast and colon cancer.

References

External links
 David S. Salomon, Google Scholar
 David S. Salomon, Google Patents
 DS Salomon, Google Patents

Living people
People from Tarrytown, New York
University at Albany, SUNY alumni
Cancer researchers
1947 births